Events from the year 1891 in Scotland.

Incumbents 

 Secretary for Scotland and Keeper of the Great Seal – The Marquess of Lothian

Law officers 
 Lord Advocate – James Robertson until August; vacant until October; then Sir Charles Pearson
 Solicitor General for Scotland – Sir Charles Pearson; then Andrew Murray

Judiciary 
 Lord President of the Court of Session and Lord Justice General – Lord Glencorse until 20 August; then from 21 September Lord Robertson
 Lord Justice Clerk – Lord Kingsburgh

Events 
 January – attempts by Scottish railway companies to evict their striking workers from company housing are resisted by force.
 30 April – An Comunn Gàidhealach is formally instituted.
 21 May – Dumbarton and Rangers are declared joint champions after drawing a play-off game 2–2 at Cathkin Park, Glasgow at the end of the inaugural season of the Scottish Football League.
 21 July – City of Glasgow Act extends city boundaries and transfers ownership of Glasgow Botanic Gardens to the Corporation.
 September – Hugh Munro publishes the first table of mountains in Scotland over 3,000 feet (914.4 m), in the Scottish Mountaineering Club Journal; these become known as the Munros.
 16 November–27 February 1892 – Buffalo Bill's Wild West show is resident at the former East End Exhibition Buildings in Glasgow.
 18 December – the largest conventional civilian sailing ship ever built on the River Clyde, the 5-masted barque-rigged steel-hulled vessel Maria Rickmers (3,822 GRT), is launched by Russell & Co. at Port Glasgow for Rickmers Reederei of Bremerhaven.
 Hydroelectricity installation at Fort Augustus Abbey.
 The Honourable Company of Edinburgh Golfers moves from Musselburgh to a new private course at Muirfield.

Births 
 7 February – D. Alan Stevenson, lighthouse engineer and philatelist (died 1971)
 2 April – Jack Buchanan, actor and producer (died 1957)
 9 April – Agnes Mure Mackenzie, historian and writer (died 1955)
 7 May – Harry McShane, socialist (died 1988)
 8 November – Neil M. Gunn, novelist (died 1973)

Deaths 
 12 March – John Dick Peddie, architect, businessman and Liberal Party MP for Kilmarnock Burghs (1880–1885) (born 1824)
 19 April – Hugh Smellie, steam locomotive engineer (born 1840)
 11 May – Alexander Beith, Free Church minister (born 1799)
 15 September – Sir John Steell, sculptor (born 1804)
 22 November – John Gregorson Campbell, folklorist and Free Church minister (born 1836)
 22 December – William Smith, architect (born  1817)

The arts
 J. M. Barrie's novel The Little Minister is published.
 Màiri Mhòr nan Òran (Mary MacPherson)'s Gaelic Songs and Poems is published.
 The ensemble attached to the Glasgow Choral Union is formally recognised as the Scottish Orchestra, predecessor of the Royal Scottish National Orchestra.

See also 
 Timeline of Scottish history
 1891 in the United Kingdom

References 

 
Years of the 19th century in Scotland
Scotland
1890s in Scotland